Asdahl is a Norwegian surname. Notable people with the surname include:

 Erland Asdahl (1921–1988), Norwegian politician
 Kristian Asdahl (1920–2000), Norwegian politician

Norwegian-language surnames